Linfield Christian School (LCS) is a private, co-educational, college-preparatory K-12 Christian school located on a 100-acre campus in Temecula, California, a city that is located between San Diego and Los Angeles. The school’s colors are navy blue, light blue and white, and the school mascot is the Lion. The current student enrollment is approximately 750 students.

History
Linfield Christian School, founded and established in 1936, was originally located in Los Angeles and was named the Culter Academy after its founder, Dr. Mabel Culter. Dr. Culter began the school in a home with seven students. Rapid increases in enrollment necessitated several relocations of the campus within Los Angeles. In 1968, the academy moved to its present site and reopened in 1972 as Linfield. Don Odell was president at the time of the relocation  and Dr. Robert Mounce was the first headmaster.

Accreditation and memberships
The school is governed by a Board of Trustees, accredited by the Western Association of Schools and Colleges (WASC K-12), and holds membership in the Association of Christian Schools International (ACSI) and California Interscholastic Federation (CIF).  Linfield is also a member of the National Association for College Admission Counseling and subscribes to the Statement of Principles and Good Practice.

Academic program
The curriculum at the high school adheres to the entrance requirements of the University of California and California State University school systems.

Athletics
Linfield Christian High School competes with teams in the California Interscholastic Federation.

Recent accomplishments

2010-Present 
Basketball (B) CIF Champion
Basketball (G) CIF Champion
Tennis (G) CIF Champion
Football CIF Champion

2009-10 
Football CIF Champion
Girls Tennis CIF Semi-Finalist
Baseball CIF Finalist
Basketball (B) CIF Semi-Finalist
Boys Tennis CIF Semi-Finalist

References

External links
www.linfield.com

Christian schools in California
Educational institutions established in 1936
High schools in Riverside County, California
Nondenominational Christian schools in the United States
Private high schools in California
Private middle schools in California
Private elementary schools in California
Temecula, California
1936 establishments in California